Salimata Fofana is an Ivorian judoka. She won one of the bronze medals in the women's 52-kg event at the 2015 African Games held in Brazzaville, Republic of the Congo.

She won one of the bronze medals in the women's 52-kg event at the 2016 African Judo Championships held in Tunis, Tunisia and at the 2019 African Judo Championships held in Cape Town, South Africa.

In 2020, she also won one of the bronze medals in women's 52-kg event at the 2020 African Judo Championships held in Antananarivo, Madagascar. At the 2021 African Judo Championships held in Dakar, Senegal, she won the silver medal in her event.

References

External links 
 

Living people
Year of birth missing (living people)
Place of birth missing (living people)
Ivorian female judoka
African Games medalists in judo
African Games bronze medalists for Ivory Coast
Competitors at the 2015 African Games
Competitors at the 2019 African Games